William Donnison Ford (October 31, 1779 in Providence, Rhode Island – October 1, 1833 in  Sackets Harbor, New York), was an American lawyer and politician from New York.

Life
Ford's family moved to western New York in the 1780s.  He attended Fairfield Seminary, studied law with Gaylord Griswold and Simeon Ford, was admitted to the bar in 1809, and commenced practice in Fairfield.

He was a member of the New York State Assembly from Herkimer County in 1816 and 1817. In 1817 he moved to Watertown, New York, where he practiced law and served as a state commissioner of bankruptcy.

Ford was elected as a Democratic-Republican to the Sixteenth United States Congress, holding office from March 4, 1819, to March 3, 1821. Afterwards he resumed the practice of law, and also served in the judicial position of Master in Chancery. He was a Trustee of the Village of Watertown in 1827 and also served as District Attorney of Jefferson County.

He moved to Sackets Harbor in 1830, and died there on October 1, 1833.  He was buried at Lakeside Cemetery in Sackets Harbor.

References

The New York Civil List compiled by Franklin Benjamin Hough (pages 70, 190, 192, 274; Weed, Parsons and Co., 1858)

1779 births
1833 deaths
Politicians from Providence, Rhode Island
People from Fairfield, New York
Politicians from Watertown, New York
New York (state) lawyers
Members of the New York State Assembly
Democratic-Republican Party members of the United States House of Representatives from New York (state)
New York (state) state court judges
County district attorneys in New York (state)
Burials in New York (state)
19th-century American lawyers